Hum Awards are annual Pakistani accolades bestowed by the Hum Network Limited in recognition of excellence in programming of television, fashion and music industry of Pakistan. Winners are awarded the Hum Award of Merit. The awards were first presented in 2013 at a ceremony held at the Karachi Expo Centre.

The awards are now reputed as an official ceremony of Hum TV, and has been given in more than a dozen categories.

History
Hum TV is one of the biggest and most watched television channels in Pakistan. Hum Television Network and Entertainment Channel is subsidiary of Hum TV that generate from its branch to appreciate its work and artist. Hum Network launched its first channel in 2005 and within 2 years it became a TV channel which was watched globally, surpassing others in rating and viewership.

It is the first brand of Hum Network Limited (KSE:HUMNL). Becoming one of leading entertainment media Hum Channel started its own Awards to honor its TV artist and artist or actors from fashion and music all over the Pakistan. Hum on-aired its first award ceremony on 12 March 2013 and broadcast it on 28 April 2013 worldwide. It is noted for being the first of its type of awards in Pakistan.

Hum Honor artist of its own channel in only one field of TV were panned in artist across the country. 1st Hum Awards awarded artist in 32 categories for the major field: television (Only Hum TV), ceremony garnered viewership of over 5 million people in Pakistan and overseas.

The award was first presented in 2013.

Hum statuette

Structure of Hum statuette and representation
 Official name: Hum Award of Merit,
 Height: 11 inches,
 Weight: 6½ pounds,
 Color: Dull Golden,
 Represents: Hum TV logo
 Design: A Urdu Alphabet "ہم", which is also a TV logo of hum channel, describe "NO ONE IS LIKE US"
 Designer: Hum Channel
 Manufacturing time: 6 weeks for 65 statuettes
 Number of awards presented: 62 (as of 1st ceremony)

Design

Hum award is the representation of HUM channel logo, describing the tagline of channel "No One is Like Us", also it is the one of the Urdu alphabet, design manufacture by hum management. As of first ceremony this is the first style of trophy and hence Mahira Khan and Noman Ejaz become the pioneer and first holder of most important Best actress and Best actor category respectively. Total 62 awards were awarded in 1st ceremony.

Nomination

Voting
The Hum Television Network and Entertainment Channel (HTNEC), a  Hum TV sub organization holds the management system of Hum Awards, since 2013, voting generates into two types:

 Viewers Choice Awards
 Jury Choice Awards

in viewer's choices award some popular categories set to open for public voting and awarded that categories upon highest votes by public but the others is opposite and completely voted and viewed by Jury panel. as of 1st Hum Awards, 7 categories from TV, Music and Fashion were set to open for public voting, and that collective voting for all categories was 10,56,800, rest of awards were completely judges and jury based.

Rules
According to any award rule, a drama serial must be acclaimed and should have completed its broadcasting. How ever exception can be made, e.g. For third ceremony when nominations revealed two of seven best nominated dramas, were still running, but both dramas were started its broadcast in 2014. All the nominees and winner must be from the previous year of the ceremony held, e.g.: for ceremony 2014, drama serial must be nominated from 2013. To maintain the equality and balance hum decided not to nominate those drama serials in main categories who will or shall have cult followings, e.g.: drama serial Humsafar was nominated in only one category for public as it had a cult following and huge acclaim. the rest of the rules and regulation are regular and trepus.

Ceremony

Telecast
Hum awards ceremony is a recorded show, that held live early in March and on-aired in late April. The Channel recently cannot afford live telecast on some social grounds, Hum TV CEO Sultana Siddiqui shared her thoughts saying that it plans live show in coming years. As per trend in such ceremonies, ceremony holds a 45 minutes pre-show or more commonly called red carpet, this show is also recorded and set on aired one day or half an hour prior to ceremony/main event.

Venues
Most of the ceremonies in Pakistan held at Expo Centres of both Karachi and Lahore, Hum Awards held at Expo Center, Karachi, Sindh, Pakistan. 3rd Hum Awards ceremony took place on 9 April 2015, at Dubai World Trade Centre, Dubai, UAE, and will be televised after a month. For the first time and it is the country's only second entertainment media awarding event after Lux Style Awards which will be held in Dubai. The reason to hold the ceremony in Dubai was Hum Network's completion of a 10 years and global success.

Award ceremonies

Hum Award has pulled in a bigger haul when TV dramas and programs hits are favoured to win the Best Drama of the year, as of first ceremony, Best Drama Serial Winner is held by critically acclaimed Hum serial Shehr-e-Zaat, written and playwright-ed by modern age popular fiction writer Umera Ahmad.

Awards of Merit categories
Following is the listing of Hum Awards Merit categories since 2013.

Current categories

Television
Jury Awards

Popular Awards

As of 2nd ceremony, criteria of awards has been changed by management, Television Category has been split into two portions one is Viewers Choice Category and other is Jury's Choice Category. In first ceremony Viewers and Jury both were awarded but didn't mention visibly  and awarded. As of third-year ceremony Best Onscreen Couple Popular awards is not awarded also its discontinuation is yet be confirmed.

Music

At 3rd Hum Awards, Best Music band and Best Solo Artist were not awarded, however, a new category called Best Music Single was introduced. Also similar to the TV categories, the discontinuation of music band and solo artist category is yet to be confirmed.

Fashion

After second year ceremony, neither the Best Designer Menswear nor Best Designer Womenswear awards were presented. Also their discontinuation is yet to be confirmed.

Discontinued categories

 Best Drama Series 2013 only
 Best Television Host 2013 only 
 Best Comic Actor 2013 only

Special categories
The Special Hum Awards are voted on by special committees, rather than by the Hum membership as a whole. They are not always presented on a consistent annual basis. Following is the listing of Hum Awards Special categories since 2012.

Current special categories
 Hum Honorary Lifetime Achievement Award: since 2012
 Special Recognition to Pakistani Television Starlets: since 2012
 Hum Honorary Music Award: Since 2012 (not awarded in second ceremony)

Discontinued special categories

 Hum Honorary Most Challenging Subject Award 2013
 Hum Honorary Phenomenal Serial Award 2013

Associated events

 Nomination luncheon
 Invitation Event
 Making of Awards
 Awards Pre-Show
 Winners Bash party

See also
 Lux Style Awards
 List of Hum Awards Ceremonies
 List of Asian television awards
 List of fashion awards
 Hum Awards pre-show

References

External links
 Hum Awards official website
 Hum Television Network and Entertainment Channel (HTNEC)
  (run by the Hum Television Network and Entertainment Channel)

 
Hum Network Limited
Annual events in Pakistan
Pakistani television awards
Pakistani music awards
Pakistani fashion awards
Awards established in 2013
2013 establishments in Pakistan